Iynefer can refer to:

Iynefer I, an Egyptian prince of the Fourth Dynasty, son of Sneferu
Iynefer II, an Egyptian prince of the Fourth Dynasty, son of Khufu